Prince Sarojini Manmatharajah Charles is a Sri Lankan civil servant who also served as former Governor of the Northern Province.

Charles is a Catholic and the daughter of a school principal. She has a degree from the University of Jaffna and masters degrees in disaster management and business administration from the University of Peradeniya and Rajarata University of Sri Lanka.

Charles was Additional District Secretary (AGA) for Vavuniya District before becoming District Secretary (GA) for the district in October 2008. Following the end of the Sri Lankan Civil War Charles was the senior civil servant in charge of the internment camps for 300,000 residents from Vanni. She was appointed District Secretary for Batticaloa District in May 2012.

Charles was appointed Director General of Sri Lanka Customs in September 2017. She was removed from the post in January 2019, allegedly after refusing to give into government pressure in respect of investigations into 143 suspicious cargo containers. She was re-instated swiftly following industrial action by customs workers.

Charles was appointed secretary of the Ministry of Healthcare and Indigenous Medical Services in November 2019. She was sworn in as Governor of the Northern Province on 30 December 2019. In October 2021, Jeevan Thiagarajah replaced her as the new governor of Northern Province.

References

Alumni of the University of Jaffna
Alumni of the University of Peradeniya
Alumni of the Rajarata University of Sri Lanka
Government Agents (Sri Lanka)
Governors of Northern Province, Sri Lanka
Living people
Permanent secretaries of Sri Lanka
Sri Lankan Roman Catholics
Sri Lankan Tamil civil servants
Sri Lankan Tamil women
Year of birth missing (living people)